Khala may refer to:

 Khala, Hama, a village in Syria
 Khala, a fictional religion in the StarCraft video game universe
Khala (dog breed), Bolivian dog breed

See also 
 Kahla (disambiguation)